is a railway station on the Shinano Railway Line in the town of Sakaki, Nagano, Japan, operated by the third-sector railway operating company Shinano Railway. The station also has a freight terminal operated by the Japan Freight Railway Company.

Lines
Sakaki Station is served by the Shinano Railway Line and is 50.4 kilometers from the starting point of the line at Karuizawa Station.

Station layout
The station consists of one ground-level island platform serving two tracks, connected to the station building by a footbridge. The station is staffed.

Platforms

Adjacent stations

History
The station opened on 15 August 1888.

Passenger statistics
In fiscal 2017, the station was used by an average of 838 passengers daily (boarding passengers only).

Surrounding area
Sakaki Town Hall

See also
 List of railway stations in Japan

References

External links

  

Railway stations in Japan opened in 1888
Railway stations in Nagano Prefecture
Shinano Railway Line
Stations of Japan Freight Railway Company
Sakaki, Nagano